Kokpekti is a district of the East Kazakhstan & Abai regions in eastern Kazakhstan. The administrative center of the district is the selo of Kokpekti.

Geography
The district is located in the central part of the region. In the south, the district borders on Tarbagatay District, in the west - on Zharma, in the north - on Ulansky district, in the east it is washed by Bukhtarma reservoir, through which it borders on Altai, Katon-Karagai and Kurshimsky districts.

The relief of the territory of the district is mainly hilly, in the north - mountainous (Kalbinsky ridge), in the south - the northern part  basins of Lake Zaisan. The highest point of the region is Mount Karazhal (1,606 m).

References

Districts of Kazakhstan
East Kazakhstan Region